Grand Ayatollah Saleh Taei  (Arabic: صالح الطائي) (born 1948) is an Iraqi Twelver Shi'a Marja.

He's a religious figure known for his opinion on the need to reconnect the Islamic sects and forbidding the division of doctrines. 
He has studied in seminaries of Najaf, Iraq under Grand Ayatollah Abul-Qassim Khoei and Mohammad Mohammad Sadeq al-Sadr.

Opinions
On the 10th of January 2008, he published his opinion on forbidding the division of doctrines in Islam.
حرمة تقسيم المسلمين الى سنة وشيعة

See also
List of Maraji

Notes

External links
الموقع الرسمي / Official website 
مكتب المرجع آية الله العظمى الشيخ صالح الطائي
صالح الطائي يطالب بتأجيل التظاهرة المزمع تنظيمها غدا
YouTube channel 

Iraqi grand ayatollahs
Iraqi Islamists
Shia Islamists
1948 births
Living people